Zeki Erkilinc (born 22 January 1998) is a Dutch footballer who plays as a forward for Derde Divisie club HSC '21.

Club career
A youth product of FC Twente, Erkilinc joined Heracles Almelo on loan on 17 August 2017. On 11 May 2018, Erkilinc signed his first professional contract with Heracles Almelo. He made his professional debut with Heracles in a 4–2 Eredivisie win over FC Groningen on 21 October 2018.

On 21 March 2022, Erkilinc signed with Derde Divisie club HSC '21.

Personal life
Born in the Netherlands, Erkilinc is of Turkish descent.

References

External links
 
 Bild Profile
 HAFC Profile

1998 births
Living people
Sportspeople from Hengelo
Dutch footballers
Dutch people of Turkish descent
Association football forwards
Heracles Almelo players
FC Dordrecht players
VfB Lübeck players
FC Gießen players
Eredivisie players
Eerste Divisie players
Regionalliga players
Dutch expatriate footballers
Expatriate footballers in Germany
Dutch expatriate sportspeople in Germany
Footballers from Overijssel